WAAS is an acronym for the Wide Area Augmentation System, an air navigation aid to supplement GPS.

WAAS, Waas, or WaaS may also refer to:

 Waas (surname)
 Wide area application services, technology developed by Cisco Systems
 Wilmington Academy of Arts and Sciences
 Windows as a Service, a business model for Windows 10
 Workplace as a Service, a cloud-computing service
 World Academy of Art and Science, international organization